Balneatrix is a Gram negative, aerobic and motile bacteria genus from the family of Oceanospirillaceae with one known species (Balneatrix alpica).

References

Oceanospirillales
Monotypic bacteria genera
Bacteria genera